Ben Hamill Procter (February 21, 1927 – April 17, 2012) was a historian who served from 1957 to 2000 on the faculty of Texas Christian University in Fort Worth, Texas.

A native of Temple, Texas, Procter moved with his family to Austin, where he graduated from Stephen F. Austin High School. He obtained Bachelor of Arts and master's degrees from the University of Texas at Austin. He then received a second master's degree and his Ph.D. from Harvard University in Cambridge, Massachusetts. He served in the United States Navy during the last months of World War II.  From 1979 to 1980, Procter was the president of the Texas State Historical Association. Before he became a history professor, he played football briefly with the Los Angeles Rams until his athletic focus was halted by an injury.

Procter held the Cecil and Ida Green Emeritus chair in the TCU History Department. He received the Summerfield R. Roberts Award for best book contribution to Texas history. He was a Minnie Stevens Piper Foundation fellow, honored for teaching and research. He was a biographer of newspaper publisher William Randolph Hearst and  U.S. Senator John Henninger Reagan.

Donald R. Walker (1941-2016), professor emeritus of history at Texas Tech University in Lubbock, called Procter "among the most respected and admired members of the history profession in Texas. He will be missed by students, colleagues. and other historians. ... May he rest in peace."

Selected publications

 (with a foreword by J. Frank Dobie)
 Scribner published A Texas Ranger by Napoleon Augustus Jennings (1856–1919) in 1899. Jennings was married to the singer Edith Helena.

 (4th edition, 2003)
 
 (See John Henninger Reagan.)

References

External links
Wake Forest University speaking engagement
Texas Politics by Ben H. Procter

2012 deaths
1927 births
People from Temple, Texas
Los Angeles Rams players
University of Texas at Austin College of Liberal Arts alumni
Harvard University alumni
Texas Christian University faculty
People from Fort Worth, Texas
Historians of the United States
Texas Democrats
United States Navy personnel of World War II
Neurological disease deaths in Texas
Deaths from Parkinson's disease
Historians from Texas